This is a list of the equipment of the Royal Netherlands Army.

Vehicles

Armoured vehicles

Artillery and air defence

Logistic and engineering vehicles

Miscellaneous

Unmanned aerial vehicles

Infantry weapons and small arms

References

External links
 Weaponry section on the official Ministry of Defence website (in Dutch)
 Vehicles section on the official Ministry of Defence website (in Dutch)
 

Military equipment of the Netherlands
Netherlands Army